Menegazzia myriotrema is a species of foliose lichen found in Australia.

See also
List of Menegazzia species

References

myriotrema
Lichen species
Lichens described in 1896
Lichens of Australia
Taxa named by Johannes Müller Argoviensis